Marko Zečević (born 6 August 1990) is a Serbian football forward.

Club career
Born in Novi Sad, Zečević was a member of FK Novi Sad from 2008 to 2013, and made 20 Serbian First League appearances. In the meantime, he was loaned to Crvena Zvezda Novi Sad.

Zečević joined OFK Bačka for 2013–14 season. For two seasons playing for this club, he made 47 appearances and scored 21 goals. First season playing for OFK Bačka, Zečević ended with 26 caps and 10 goals in the Serbian League Vojvodina. For the 2014–15 season, Zečević played with OFK Bačka in the Serbian First League, and was also a vice-captain, after Veseljko Trivunović. Zečević made 21 appearances and was the best scorer of team with 11 goals, including 5 goals in 2 matches against Sloga Kraljevo, and was also declared as the man of the match against Sloga Petrovac na Mlavi when he scored 2 goals for away win. Other 4 goals he scored in matches against Bežanija, Proleter Novi Sad, Javor Ivanjica, and Metalac Gornji Milanovac.

In summer of 2015, Zečević joined Javor Ivanjica.

Zečević returned to OFK Bačka on one-year loan for the 2016–17 season, after the club promoted in the Serbian SuperLiga.

Career statistics

Club

Honours
Bačka
Serbian League Vojvodina: 2013–14

References

External links
 Marko Zečević stats at utakmica.rs 
 
 

1990 births
Living people
Footballers from Novi Sad
Association football forwards
Serbian footballers
RFK Novi Sad 1921 players
OFK Bačka players
FK Javor Ivanjica players
Serbian First League players
Serbian SuperLiga players